Nehemiah Odhiambo Ngoche (born 7 August 1984) is a Kenyan cricketer. He plays both One Day Internationals and Twenty20 Internationals for Kenya. He is the brother of fellow Kenyan cricketers Lameck Onyango, James Ngoche and Shem Ngoche.

International career
Odhiambo was the first-ever player to take a T20I five-wicket haul in the home soil when he did it on 4 February 2010 against Scotland at Nairobi and also became the second bowler to grab a fifer in T20I history. He was also the first Kenyan to achieve this feat.

Odhiambo was one of three brothers, others being James and Shem, in the Kenyan squad for the World Cup held in Bangladesh, India and Sri Lanka from 19 February to 2 April 2011.

In January 2018, he was named in Kenya's squad for the 2018 ICC World Cricket League Division Two tournament. In September 2018, he was named in Kenya's squad for the 2018 Africa T20 Cup. In November 2019, he was named in Kenya's squad for the Cricket World Cup Challenge League B tournament in Oman. In October 2021, he was named in Kenya's squad for the Regional Final of the 2021 ICC Men's T20 World Cup Africa Qualifier tournament in Rwanda.

References

External links

1984 births
Living people
Kenyan cricketers
Kenya One Day International cricketers
Kenya Twenty20 International cricketers
Southern Stars cricketers
Cricketers at the 2007 Cricket World Cup
Cricketers at the 2011 Cricket World Cup